The 1933 Copa Beccar Varela Final was the final that decided the winner of the 2nd edition of the Argentine domestic cup. The cup was contested by Racing Club (for second consecutive time), and Rosarian Club Central Córdoba. The match was held in River Plate Stadium on February 11, 1934.

The match was suspended after 88 minutes when Racing players abandoned the field in protest of a penalty kick awarded to Central Córdoba. On February 22, the organising body Liga Argentina de Football, awarded the title to Central Córdoba, which won their first national championship.

Qualified teams

Overview 

The cup was contested by 30 teams which included clubs participating in the 1933 Primera División organised by dissident association, Liga Argentina de Football (the first professional in Argentina), 6 from Liga Rosarina de Football, 1 from Liga Santafesina, 1 from Liga Cordobesa, and 4 Uruguayan clubs (including Peñarol and Nacional) that gave the cup international status. Teams played a single round-robin before entering to the second stage, which was played in a direct elimination format.

In the first stage, Racing beat Boca Juniors (with a conclusive 7–1), loss to Atlanta 3–4, and beat San Lorenzo 3–0, and Argentinos Juniors 3–0, earning a place in the knockout stage, where the team eliminated Nacional de Rosario (32), Belgrano de Córdoba 5–0, and rival Independiente in the semifinals (3–3, 4–1 playoff)

Central Córdoba beat Nacional (R) 4–1, Tiro Federal 2–1, Newell's Old Boys 2–1, tied with Belgrano 1–1, and lost to Rosario Central 0–1, finishing 1st in the group and therefore qualifying for the second stage. Central Córdoba then eliminated Platense 2–0, Atlanta 2–0, and Gimnasia y Esgrima de Santa Fe 3–2 in the semifinal.

In the final match, held in River Plate Stadium in Recoleta, Buenos Aires, Racing quickly took advantage when Demetrio Conidares scored in the second minute. Tomás Constantini fired back, scoring twice to put Central Córdoba in the lead at 2–1. Racing goalkeeper Juan Botasso then stopped a penalty kick by winger Telmo Collins. In the second half, Vicente Zito scored for Racing forcing a 2–2 tie. With only 2 minutes to play, Uruguayan referee Sobreira awarded a penalty kick to Central Córdoba. Players of Racing abandoned the field in protest against the decision, and the match was then ended abruptly. On February 22, the Liga Argentina awarded points to Central Córdoba therefore the Rosarian team was crowned champion of the competition, winning not only their first Beccar Varela trophy but also their first national title ever.

Match details

References

b
1934 in Argentine football
Football in Buenos Aires